James Marbury "Sammy" Holbrook (July 17, 1910 - April 10, 1991)  was a Major League Baseball catcher. That year, he served as the primary backup to starting catcher Cliff Bolton.

Holbrook's minor league baseball career spanned 14 seasons, from  until . In , he served as player-manager of the Federalsburg A's of the Eastern Shore League. Holbrook batted .361 in 98 games while leading the team to the league championship in his only season as manager.

Sources

Major League Baseball catchers
Washington Senators (1901–1960) players
Talladega Indians players
Columbus Foxes players
Chattanooga Lookouts players
Sanford Lookouts players
Trenton Senators players
Federalsburg A's players
Meridian Scrappers players
Louisville Colonels (minor league) players
Elmira Pioneers players
Little Rock Travelers players
Buffalo Bisons (minor league) players
Minor league baseball managers
Baseball players from Mississippi
Sportspeople from Meridian, Mississippi
1910 births
1991 deaths